Princess is the debut studio album by English singer Princess, released in 1986 by Supreme Records. It was produced by Stock Aitken Waterman, and it peaked at No. 15 on the UK Albums Chart and at No. 81 in Australia.

Track listing
Original LP version

Standard CD version

Charts

References

External links

1986 debut albums
Princess (singer) albums
Albums produced by Stock Aitken Waterman